"The Witch in the Stone Boat" ( 'the giantess in the stone boat') is an Icelandic folktale, originally collected by Jón Árnason (1864), translated into English in Andrew Lang's fairy tale collection The Yellow Fairy Book (1894).

The antagonist is a giantess (skessa; elsewhere called troll-woman, and revealed to be the sister of a three-headed giant), though rendered as "witch" by Lang, who shape-shifts and assumes the place of a queen, while having the true queen imprisoned. 

It has been categorized as a subtype of ATU 462, "The Outcast Queens and the Ogress Queen".

Textual notes

"Skessan á steinnökkvanum" (literally 'The  [giantess] in the stone boat'), was a selection in Jón Árnason's folktale/fairy tale collection, Íslenzkar Þjóðsögur og Æfintýri Vol. 2 (1862–64).

Andrew Lang's English translation "The Witch in the Stone Boat" appeared in the Yellow Fairy Book, whose first edition was published in 1894.

Other German translations are Adeline Rittershaus's "Die Riesin im Steinboot" (1902), and the similarly title rendering by Hans Naumann and Ida Naumann (1923).

The tale was translated into English with the title The Troll in the Stone-Craft, in the English version of Jón Árnason's Icelandic Legends: Second series, and in a later publication as The Giantess and the Granite Boat.

Tale type
This folktale is considered to be a version of Aarne-Thompson-Uther type 462 "The Outcast Queens and the Ogress Queen", and is cognate with the Italian tale "The Dragon" (Pentamerone IV. 5).

A second variant of the tale, according to the type description, is The Son of Seven Queens, an Indian fairy tale collected by Joseph Jacobs. In it, a king who was married to seven co-wives follows a white hind during a hunt. Hot on its trail, the king tracks the hind to a hut in the woods, where an old witch lives. Soon after, he meets a woman of immense beauty who he realises is the transformed white hind. As a first request, the supernatural woman orders the king to get rid of his former wives in order to replace the outcast queens. Another variant is The Demon is at last conquered by the King's Son, collected by Maive Stokes, in Indian Fairy Tales (1880).

Variants of the tale type are also attested in South Asian and Latin American folktale traditions.

Synopsis
A king told his son Sigurd to marry, recommending a daughter of another king as prospective wife. Sigurd traveled to that kingdom and made his marriage proposal, and the bride's king agreed to the match, on condition that Sigurd would stay and help him as long as he could. Sigurd promised to remain, until such time as he received news of his father's death. When Sigurd learned of his father's death, he set sail for his homeland with his wife and their two-year-old son.

The ship was one day short of completing its journey when the wind died down. Sigurd was overcome with drowsiness and left the queen and his child alone on the deck. There approached a stone boat carrying a frightening "witch" (Lang. tr.) or "troll-wife". The witch boarded ship, snatched away the baby and assumed the queen's place by transforming into her likeness and wearing the fine clothes she stripped from the queen. The imposter put the real queen on the stone boat, and spoke incantations to the boat telling it to go without straying to her brother in the underworld. The boat shot off and was soon out of sight from the ship. The disappearance of the real mother made the baby cry uncontrollably, and the witch's effort to quiet it was to no avail. So the witch went beneath deck and scolded Sigurd for leaving her alone on the deck. Such a temper tantrum was something Sigurd had never received from his wife, and it surprised him, but he thought she had an excusable reason this time. But for all the efforts of the two of them, they could not stop the boy from crying.

Sigurd was now the ruler of his homeland, succeeding his dead father. The little boy who used to be such a quiet child hardly stopped crying since that day, so he had to be given up to be raised by a wet nurse (or foster mother ), one of the court ladies. Sigurd noticed his wife's change in temperament: she was now more "haughty and stubborn, and difficult to deal with".

But the fake queen's identity was to unravel. Two young courtiers who were in the habit of playing chess (actually Tafl games)in the room next to the queen eavesdropped and spied on her through a crack. They heard her say that the more widely she yawned, the more she transformed back into a troll, and even as she spoke, she gave a huge yawn, and reverted into the form of a hideous troll-wife. And through the floor of her room appeared her brother, a three-headed giant (þríhöfðaður þussi), who brought her a trough full of meat, which she devoured.

Meanwhile, the boy-prince's wet nurse was about to witness the supernatural appearance of the true queen. When the wet nurse turned the [candle-]light on, several planks from the floor rose up, and from underneath appeared an astonishingly beautiful white-clad woman, dressed in linen. Clasped around her waist was an iron belt, with a chain leading down into the ground below. The queen embraced the child for a moment, and returned under the floor again. Her appearance was repeated the second night, and the nurse heard the queen say lamentfully that "Two are gone, and one only is left," which the nurse guessed must mean that the third night would be her final appearance.

The next night, King Sigurd was in the nurse's room with a drawn sword in hand, awaiting the woman, whom he instantly recognized as his own wife. He cut the chain in two and great noises came from beneath the earth. The true queen now told her story. The three-headed giant had tried to force her to marry him (actually, to sleep with him), and at last she consented provided she could visit her son for three consecutive days, hoping for an opportunity to be liberated. The giant must have plummeted to death, the crashing "caused by him in his death throes". The real queen was then restored to all her dignity, and the king had the false queen immediately captured and stoned to death, her body torn apart by horses.

Retellings

An embellished retelling was given by Mrs. Angus W. Hall, entitled "The Giantess and the Granite Boat" (1897). Here Sigurd's wife is given the name "Helga", his father-in-law "Hardrada", and the young son "Kurt".

See also
Brother and Sister
The Three Little Men in the Wood
The White Duck
The Wonderful Birch

Explanatory notes

References
Citations

Bibliography

 

 

 

 

 

 

Icelandic fairy tales
Fictional witches
Female literary villains
Scandinavian folklore
Trolls
Witchcraft in fairy tales

Fiction about shapeshifting
ATU 460-499
Jón Árnason (author)
Witches in folklore